Lauren Winfield-Hill (born 16 August 1990) is an English cricketer who currently plays for Yorkshire, Northern Diamonds, Oval Invincibles, Melbourne Stars and England. She plays as a right-handed batter and occasional wicket-keeper. She made her international debut in 2013, and was part of the England team that won the 2017 World Cup. She has previously played for Northern Superchargers in The Hundred and Brisbane Heat, Hobart Hurricanes and Adelaide Strikers in the Big Bash.

Career
In the summer of 2014 she appeared 5 times in various games including the one against South Africa. She is the holder of one of the first tranche of 18 ECB central contracts for women players, which were announced in April 2014.

Winfield was a member of the winning women's team at the 2017 Women's Cricket World Cup held in England.

In October 2018, she was named in England's squad for the 2018 ICC Women's World Twenty20 tournament in the West Indies. In February 2019, she was awarded a full central contract by the England and Wales Cricket Board (ECB) for 2019. In June 2019, the ECB named her in England's squad for their opening match against Australia to contest the Women's Ashes. In January 2020, she was named in England's squad for the 2020 ICC Women's T20 World Cup in Australia.

On 18 June 2020, Winfield was named in a squad of 24 players to begin training ahead of international women's fixtures starting in England following the COVID-19 pandemic. In June 2021, Winfield-Hill was named as in England's Test squad for their one-off match against India. In 2021, she was drafted by Northern Superchargers for the inaugural season of The Hundred.

In December 2021, Winfield-Hill was named in England's squad for their tour to Australia to contest the Women's Ashes. In February 2022, she was named in England's team for the 2022 Women's Cricket World Cup in New Zealand.

In April 2022, she was bought by the Oval Invincibles for the 2022 season of The Hundred. She was named as Player of the Year in the 2022 Rachael Heyhoe Flint Trophy, as the tournament's leading run-scorer with 470 runs at an average of 78.30.

Personal life
Winfield's nickname is "Loz". In October 2019, Winfield-Hill was diagnosed with Crohn's disease.

In March 2020, she married Australian sportswoman Courtney Hill. The two have lived together in England since 2018.

See also
 List of people diagnosed with Crohn's disease

References

External links

1990 births
Living people
England women Test cricketers
England women One Day International cricketers
England women Twenty20 International cricketers
Cricketers from York
Yorkshire women cricketers
Yorkshire Diamonds cricketers
Northern Diamonds cricketers
Northern Superchargers cricketers
Oval Invincibles cricketers
Brisbane Heat (WBBL) cricketers
Hobart Hurricanes (WBBL) cricketers
Adelaide Strikers (WBBL) cricketers
Melbourne Stars (WBBL) cricketers
English cricketers of the 21st century
Lesbian sportswomen
English LGBT sportspeople
LGBT cricketers
21st-century English women
Wicket-keepers